In mathematics, Jacobi polynomials (occasionally called hypergeometric polynomials) 
are a class of classical orthogonal polynomials. They are orthogonal with respect to the weight
 on the interval . The Gegenbauer polynomials, and thus also the Legendre, Zernike and Chebyshev polynomials, are special cases of the Jacobi polynomials.

The Jacobi polynomials were introduced by Carl Gustav Jacob Jacobi.

Definitions

Via the hypergeometric function
The Jacobi polynomials are defined via the hypergeometric function as follows:

where  is Pochhammer's symbol (for the rising factorial). In this case, the series for the hypergeometric function is finite, therefore one obtains the following equivalent expression:

Rodrigues' formula
An equivalent definition is given by Rodrigues' formula:

If , then it reduces to the Legendre polynomials:

Alternate expression for real argument
For real  the Jacobi polynomial can alternatively be written as

and for integer 

where  is the gamma function.

are nonnegative integers, the Jacobi polynomial can be written as

Special cases

Basic properties

Orthogonality
The Jacobi polynomials satisfy the orthogonality condition

As defined, they do not have unit norm with respect to the weight. This can be corrected by dividing by the square root of the right hand side of the equation above, when .

Although it does not yield an orthonormal basis, an alternative normalization is sometimes preferred due to its simplicity:

Symmetry relation
The polynomials have the symmetry relation

thus the other terminal value is

Derivatives
The th derivative of the explicit expression leads to

Differential equation
The Jacobi polynomial  is a solution of the second order linear homogeneous differential equation

Recurrence relations
The recurrence relation for the Jacobi polynomials of fixed ,  is:

  
Since the Jacobi polynomials can be described in terms of the hypergeometric function, recurrences of the hypergeometric function give equivalent recurrences of the Jacobi polynomials. In particular, Gauss' contiguous relations correspond to the identities

Generating function
The generating function of the Jacobi polynomials is given by

where

and the branch of square root is chosen so that .

Asymptotics of Jacobi polynomials

where

and the "" term is uniform on the interval  for every .

The asymptotics of the Jacobi polynomials near the points  is given by the Mehler–Heine formula

The asymptotics outside  is less explicit.

Applications

Wigner d-matrix
The expression allows the expression of the Wigner d-matrix 
 (for )
in terms of Jacobi polynomials:

See also
Askey–Gasper inequality
Big q-Jacobi polynomials
Continuous q-Jacobi polynomials
Little q-Jacobi polynomials
Pseudo Jacobi polynomials
Jacobi process
Gegenbauer polynomials
Romanovski polynomials

Notes
Further reading

External links

Special hypergeometric functions
Orthogonal polynomials